Euclemensia schwarziella is a moth in the family Cosmopterigidae. It was described by August Busck in 1901. It is found in the US states of Arizona and Texas.

The larvae are parasitoids of scale insects, specifically Kermes and Allokermes species.

References

Natural History Museum Lepidoptera generic names catalog

Cosmopterigidae
Moths described in 1901